Lophiobagrus brevispinis is a species of claroteid catfish endemic to Lake Tanganyika at the border of Burundi, the Democratic Republic of the Congo, Tanzania, and Zambia. This species grows to a length of 5.1 cm (2.0 inches) TL.

References
 

Lophiobagrus
Fish of Lake Tanganyika
Fish described in 1984
Taxonomy articles created by Polbot